Shor may refer to:

Peoples and languages
 Shor language, one of the Turkic languages
 Shor people, an indigenous ethnic group of southern Siberia

People with the name

 Dan Shor (born 1956), American actor, director and writer
 David Shor (born 1991), American data scientist and political consultant
 Ephraim Zalman Shor (1551–1633), Czech rabbi
 Ilan Shor (born 1987), Moldovan hideaway businessman and politician
 Ira Shor (born 1945), American philosopher and academic
 Joseph ben Isaac Bekhor Shor (12th century), French poet
 Naum Z. Shor (1937-2006), Ukrainian mathematician
 Peter Shor (born 1959), American mathematician and academic
 Sol Shor (1913–1985), American screenwriter
 Toots Shor (1903-1977), American restaurateur

Films
 Shor (film), a 1972 Hindi film
 Shor and Shorshor, a 1926 Soviet film

Other uses
 Shor's algorithm, a quantum algorithm for integer factorization
 Toots Shor's Restaurant, New York City

See also
 Schor (disambiguation)
 Schorr, a surname
 Shore (disambiguation)

Hebrew-language surnames
Jewish surnames
Germanic-language surnames
Language and nationality disambiguation pages